Dance etiquette is the set of conventional rules which govern the social behavior of social dance by its participants. Such rules include the way in which the participants should look and the way in which they approach, dance with and leave their partner. Etiquette can vary in its specification and stringency between different styles of dance.

Further reading
Ballroom Etiquette ... Twelve lessons. New York: Dance Review Publishing Co., 1924 
Davidson, John & Mary Etiquette at a Dance: what to do and what not to do. London: W. Foulsham & Co., 1937 
How to Dance; or, the Etiquette of the Ball Room. London: Ward, Lock, etc., 1876
Karsinova Don'ts for Dancers. London: A. & C. Black, 2008  (reissue of the 1925 ed.)

References

External links

Elements of Dance Etiquette

Dance culture
Etiquette by situation